Trstenik is a South Slavic place name originating from the word trska which means reed. It may refer to:

Croatia 
 Trstenik, Dubrovnik-Neretva County, a village in the Orebić municipality, Croatia
 Trstenik (island), a small island near Korčula, Croatia
 Trstenik, Istria County, a hamlet in the Lanišće municipality, Croatia
 Trstenik, Split, a neighbourhood of the city of Split, Croatia
 Trstenik, Zagreb County, a village in the Marija Gorica municipality, Croatia

North Macedonia
 Trstenik (Rosoman), a village in Rosoman Municipality

Serbia 
 Trstenik, Serbia, a town in Serbia
 FK Trstenik, football club from the town of Trstenik, plays in Serbian League East
 Stari Trstenik, a village near the town of Trstenik

Slovenia 
 Trstenik, Benedikt, a village in the Municipality of Benedikt, northeastern Slovenia
 Trstenik, Kranj, a village in the City Municipality of Kranj, northwestern Slovenia
 Trstenik, Ormož, a village in the Municipality of Ormož, northeastern Slovenia
 Trstenik, Šentrupert, a settlement in the Municipality of Šentrupert, southeastern Slovenia

See also
 Trastenik, a town in Bulgaria
 Trǎstenik, a village in the Ruse county in Bulgaria
 Trstenik Airport, also known as "Odžaci" is an airport in Serbia, 2.5 km from the town of Trstenik and 12 km from the spa of Vrnjačka Banja
 Trstenik, Sveti Nikole, a town in North Macedonia